Neil R. Ellis  (born 1962) is a Canadian politician, currently serving as the mayor of Belleville, Ontario. He is a former Liberal Member of Parliament, who was elected to represent the riding of Bay of Quinte in the House of Commons of Canada in the 2015 federal election. In the 2019 federal election, Ellis was reelected as the Member of Parliament for the Bay of Quinte. He was defeated in the 2021 federal election.

Background

Ellis holds a bachelor's degree in law and psychology from Carleton University in Ottawa. In 1984, he became the proprietor of Doug's Bicycle, a bicycle store in Belleville which his brother had operated for five years. Ellis relinquished control of the store in 2012 after twenty-eight years of ownership.

Political career

Mayor of Belleville

During the 2003 municipal elections in Ontario Ellis ran against Belleville's incumbent mayor Mary-Ann Sills, losing by only 202 votes. Nevertheless, Ellis would run again in 2006, defeating Mary-Ann Sills to become mayor of Belleville. He would serve two terms as mayor, being reelected in 2006, and leaving office in 2014. As mayor, Ellis guided city council through the Build Belleville initiative, which involved pursuing twenty-two infrastructure projects worth $91 million. He was elected again in 2022, defeating incumbent mayor Mitch Panciuk.

Member of Parliament

In 2015, Ellis became the Liberal nominee in the newly created Bay of Quinte riding, and won the subsequent election. He would go on to win reelection in 2019. From 2015 to 2019, Ellis served as the chairman of the House of Commons Standing Committee on Veterans Affairs, until being appointed as the Parliamentary Secretary to the Minister of Agriculture and Agri-Food in December 2019.

Electoral record

Federal

Municipal

2010 Belleville Mayoral Election

2006 Belleville Mayoral Election

2003 Belleville Mayoral Election

References

External links
 Neil R. Ellis www.ourcommons.ca

Living people
Liberal Party of Canada MPs
Members of the House of Commons of Canada from Ontario
Mayors of Belleville, Ontario
Year of birth uncertain
1962 births
21st-century Canadian politicians